The Arthurian legend features many characters, including the Knights of the Round Table and members of King Arthur's family. Their names often differ from version to version and from language to language. The following is a list of characters with descriptions. 

 Indicates a Knight of the Round Table.

See also
 List of characters named Ywain in Arthurian legend

References

 
Arthurian|Arthurian characters